Passage to Marseille, also known as Message to Marseille, is a 1944 American war film made by Warner Brothers, directed by Michael Curtiz. The screenplay was by Casey Robinson and Jack Moffitt from the novel Sans Patrie (Men Without Country) by Charles Nordhoff and James Norman Hall. The music score was by Max Steiner and the cinematography was by James Wong Howe.

Passage to Marseille is one of the few films to use a flashback within a flashback, within a flashback, following the narrative structure of the novel on which it is based. The film opens at an airbase in England during World War II. Free French Captain Freycinet tells a journalist the story of the French pilots stationed there. The second flashback is at the French prison colony at Cayenne in French Guiana while the third flashback sets the scene where the lead character,  Matrac, a newspaper publisher, is framed for a murder to silence him.

Plot
In 1942, journalist Manning arrives at an English air base to learn about the Free French who are fighting the Germans.  Along with Captain Freycinet, he watches as French bomber crews prepare for a raid.  Manning's interest focuses on Jean Matrac, a gunner, and Freycinet describes Matrac's story:

Two years earlier, just before the defeat of France by the Germans, five convicts who escaped from Devil's Island are found adrift in a small canoe in the Caribbean Sea by the tramp steamer Ville de Nancy. These five men—Marius, Garou, Petit, Renault, and their leader, Matrac, are rescued and taken aboard the French freighter commanded by Captain Malo.  Later, when confronted by Captain Freycinet, the five confess to being escaped convicts from the French prison colony at Cayenne in French Guiana.  They had been recruited by Grandpère, a fervently patriotic ex-convict, to fight for France in her hour of need. To Grandpére, the inmates had recounted Matrac's troubles in pre-war France to convince the old man to choose Matrac to lead the escape. A crusading newspaper publisher, Matrac, being opposed to the Munich Pact, had been framed for murder to shut him up.

By the time the Ville de Nancy nears the port of Marseille, France has surrendered to Nazi Germany, and a collaborationist Vichy government has been set up. Upon hearing the news, the captain secretly decides not to deliver his valuable cargo to the Germans. Pro-Vichy passenger Major Duval organizes an attempt to seize control of the ship, but is defeated, in great part due to the escapees. When they reach England, the convicts join the Free French bomber squadron.

As Freycinet finishes his tale, the squadron returns from its mission over France. Renault's bomber is delayed, as Matrac is allowed to drop a letter over his family's house before returning from each mission. His wife Paula and their son, whom he has never seen, live in occupied France. Renault's bomber finally lands. It has been badly shot up, and Matrac has been killed. At Matrac's interment, Freycinet reads aloud Matrac's last, undelivered, letter to his son—a vision of the day when evil will have been defeated forever—and promises that the letter will be delivered.

Cast

Production
Passage to Marseille reunited much of the cast of Casablanca (1942), also directed by Curtiz, including Humphrey Bogart, Claude Rains, Sydney Greenstreet, Peter Lorre and Helmut Dantine. Other actors connected to both productions included Michèle Morgan, who had been the original choice for the female lead for Casablanca;  Victor Francen, Philip Dorn, Corinna Mura, and George Tobias.

Although exotic locales were called for, principal photography by cinematographer James Wong Howe actually took place at the Los Angeles County Arboretum and Botanic Garden in Arcadia, California, with additional location shooting in Victorville, California.

Before Bogart began work on the film, pre-production had been underway for six months, but as a result of resisting Jack Warner's decision to cast him in Conflict (released 1945, but shot in 1943), his starring role as Matrac was in jeopardy, with Jean Gabin being touted as a replacement. Even when the issue was decided, Bogart's portrayal was hampered by marital difficulties and a lack of commitment to the project.

The flying sequences show the Free French Air Force using Boeing B-17 Flying Fortress bombers. The production took liberties with the actual bombing campaigns carried out by the Free French units, that primarily employed medium bombers such as the Martin B-26 Marauder. The use of the ubiquitous B-17 was due to its being recognizable to American audiences.

A scene showing Bogart's character machine gunning the defenseless aircrew of the downed German bomber was cut by censors in foreign releases of the film.

Reception and box-office
Bosley Crowther of The New York Times favorably reviewed Passage to Marseille, noting the film's "tough and tempestuous melodrama is something of a sequel, as it were, to the comment on Devil's Island which Warner was making five years ago. It is the studio's roaring rejoinder that a vicious and repressive penal code was still not sufficiently able to kill the love of home and freedom in French hearts."

According to Warner Bros records, the film earned $2,157,000 domestically and $1,629,000 foreign.

References
Notes

Bibliography
 Dolan, Edward F. Jr. Hollywood Goes to War. London: Bison Books, 1985. .
 Hardwick, Jack and Schnepf, Ed. "A Buff's Guide to Aviation Movies". Air Progress Aviation, Vol. 7, No. 1, Spring 1983.
 Meyers, Jeffrey. Bogart: A Life in Hollywood. London: Andre Deutsch Ltd., 1997. .
 Sperber, A.M. and Lax, Eric. Bogart. New York: William Morrow & Co., 1997. .

External links

 
 
 
 

1944 films
1940s war drama films
American aviation films
Films about journalists
American black-and-white films
Films about anti-fascism
Films based on American novels
Films directed by Michael Curtiz
Films produced by Hal B. Wallis
Films scored by Max Steiner
Films set in Marseille
Films set on Devil's Island
Warner Bros. films
World War II films made in wartime
American war drama films
1944 drama films
1940s English-language films